Gary Tinterow OAL (born 1953 in Louisville) is an American art historian and curator. A specialist on 19th-century French art, Tinterow is currently Director and Margaret Alkek Williams Chair of the Museum of Fine Arts, Houston.

Career
Born in Louisville, but raised in Houston, Tinterow graduated from Bellaire High School in 1972. He then received a Bachelor of Arts in American Studies from Brandeis University in 1976. His senior honors thesis was on Jewish architecture and was titled "Post-World War II Synagogue Architecture in America." Tinterow then proceeded to receive a Master of Arts in Art History from Harvard University in 1983.

After graduating from Harvard, Tinterow was hired at Metropolitan Museum of Art, where he would remain until 2012. There, he served as the Engelhard Chairman of the Department of Nineteenth-Century, Modern, and Contemporary Art. During that tenure, Tinterow was part of a group of curators to help formalize the Association of Art Museum Curators.

In 2012, Tinterow returned to his native Texas and was named Director and Margaret Alkek Williams Chair the Museum of Fine Arts, Houston, following the death of the preceding director, Peter Marzio.

In 2003 and 2012, respectively, Tinterow was named Chevalier and Officier of the Ordre des Arts et des Lettres by the Government of France.

Personal life
Tinterow is married to Christopher Gardner, an antiquarian. Tinterow is also a first cousin once removed of Ann Richards, former Governor of Texas, through his mother's side.

See also
List of Brandeis University people
List of gay, lesbian or bisexual people: T–V
List of Harvard University people
List of members of the Ordre des Arts et des Lettres
List of people from Houston

References

External links
Museum of Fine Arts, Houston profile

1953 births
Living people
LGBT people from Texas
Academics from Houston
Bellaire High School (Bellaire, Texas) alumni
Brandeis University alumni
Harvard University alumni
People associated with the Metropolitan Museum of Art
Museum of Fine Arts, Houston
Chevaliers of the Ordre des Arts et des Lettres
Officiers of the Ordre des Arts et des Lettres